Rise & Shine is a morning talk show that aired weekdays at 6:00 AM ET on WLTZ in Columbus, Georgia from 1989 to 2010. The show ended due to host Calvin Floyd moving to a noon talk show.

References

1980s American television talk shows
1990s American television talk shows
2000s American television talk shows
2010s American television talk shows
1989 American television series debuts
2010 American television series endings
1980s American variety television series
1990s American variety television series
2000s American variety television series
2010s American variety television series
Local talk shows in the United States